Avell Chitundu (born 30 July 1997) is a Zambian footballer who plays as a forward for the Zambia women's national team. She competed for Zambia at the 2018 Africa Women Cup of Nations, playing in one match.

References

External links

1997 births
Living people
Zambian women's footballers
Zambia women's international footballers
Women's association football forwards
ZESCO United F.C. players
Footballers at the 2020 Summer Olympics
Olympic footballers of Zambia